Jeffrey Joseph Musselman (born June 21, 1963) is a former Major League Baseball pitcher. He played for the Toronto Blue Jays and the New York Mets from 1986 to 1990.

Career

Musselman graduated from Central Regional High School in Bayville, New Jersey and Harvard University. In 1984, he played collegiate summer baseball in the Cape Cod Baseball League for the Yarmouth-Dennis Red Sox.

He was drafted in the sixth round of the 1985 Major League Baseball draft by the Blue Jays. His best season in the majors was 1987, when he appeared in 68 games for Toronto, posting a 12–5 record with a 4.15 ERA at 54 strikeouts in 89 innings of work.

On July 31, 1989, he was traded by the Toronto Blue Jays with minor leaguer Mike Brady to the New York Mets for Mookie Wilson. He appeared in 20 games for the Mets in 1989, posting a 3–2 record with a 3.08 ERA.

Personal

After retiring as a player, Musselman remained in baseball as a vice-president in the offices of sports agent Scott Boras. Musselman has three daughters. His middle daughter is Maddie Musselman,  a 2 time Gold medalist in water polo at the Summer Olympics in Rio (2016) and Tokyo (2021).

References

External links

 Jeff Musselman at Baseball Almanac

1963 births
Living people
American expatriate baseball players in Canada
Baseball players from Pennsylvania
Central Regional High School alumni
Harvard Crimson baseball players
Major League Baseball pitchers
New York Mets players
Toronto Blue Jays players
Yarmouth–Dennis Red Sox players
Dunedin Blue Jays players
Knoxville Blue Jays players
Medicine Hat Blue Jays players
Syracuse Chiefs players
Tacoma Tigers players
Tidewater Tides players
Ventura County Gulls players